Bogia District is a district in the north-west of Madang Province in Papua New Guinea. It is one of the six administrative districts that make up the province.

Almami Rural LLG is one of the three local-level government council areas of Bogia district in Madang Province.  It comprises over thirty council ward areas.

References
 Madang Provincial Economic Profile

Districts of Papua New Guinea